Maize (Zea mays subsp. mays, from  after ), also known as corn in North American and Australian English, is a cereal grain first domesticated by indigenous peoples in southern Mexico about 10,000 years ago. The leafy stalk of the plant produces pollen inflorescences (or "tassels") and separate ovuliferous inflorescences called ears that when fertilized yield kernels or seeds, which are fruits. The term maize is preferred in formal, scientific, and international usage as the common name because this refers specifically to this one grain whereas corn refers to any principal cereal crop cultivated in a country. For example, in North America and Australia corn is often used for maize, but in England and Wales it can refer to wheat or barley, and in Scotland and Ireland to oats.

Maize has become a staple food in many parts of the world, with the total production of maize surpassing that of wheat or rice. In addition to being consumed directly by humans (often in the form of masa), maize is also used for corn ethanol, animal feed and other maize products, such as corn starch and corn syrup. The six major types of maize are dent corn, flint corn, pod corn, popcorn, flour corn, and sweet corn. Sugar-rich varieties called sweet corn are usually grown for human consumption as kernels, while field corn varieties are used for animal feed, various corn-based human food uses (including grinding into cornmeal or masa, pressing into corn oil, fermentation and distillation into alcoholic beverages like bourbon whiskey), and as feedstocks for the chemical industry. Maize is also used in making ethanol and other biofuels.

Maize is widely cultivated throughout the world, and a greater weight of maize is produced each year than any other grain. In 2021, total world production was 1.2 billion tonnes. Maize is the most widely grown grain crop throughout the Americas, with 384 million metric tons grown in the United States alone in 2021. Genetically modified maize made up 85% of the maize planted in the United States in 2009. Subsidies in the United States help to account for its high level of cultivation of maize and its position as the largest producer in the world.

History

Pre-Columbian development 

Maize is a cultigen; human intervention is required for it to propagate. Whether or not the kernels fall off the cob on their own is a key piece of evidence used in archaeology to distinguish domesticated maize from its naturally-propagating teosinte ancestor. Genetic evidence can also be used to determine when various lineages split.

Most historians believe maize was domesticated in the Tehuacán Valley of Mexico. Recent research in the early 21st century has modified this view somewhat; scholars now indicate the adjacent Balsas River Valley of south-central Mexico as the center of domestication.

An 2002 study by Matsuoka et al.. has demonstrated that, rather than the multiple independent domestications model, all maize arose from a single domestication in southern Mexico about 9,000 years ago. The study also demonstrated that the oldest surviving maize types are those of the Mexican highlands. Later, maize spread from this region over the Americas along two major paths. This is consistent with a model based on the archaeological record suggesting that maize diversified in the highlands of Mexico before spreading to the lowlands.

Archaeologist Dolores Piperno has said:

Since then, even earlier dates have been published.

According to a genetic study by the Brazilian Agricultural Research Corporation (Embrapa), corn cultivation was introduced in South America from Mexico, in two great waves: the first, more than 6000 years ago, spread through the Andes. Evidence of cultivation in Peru has been found dating to about 6700 years ago. The second wave, about 2000 years ago, through the lowlands of South America.

The earliest maize plants grew only small,  corn ears, and only one per plant. In Jackson Spielvogel's view, many centuries of artificial selection (rather than the current view that maize was exploited by interplanting with teosinte) by the indigenous people of the Americas resulted in the development of maize plants capable of growing several ears per plant, which were usually several centimetres/inches long each. The Olmec and Maya cultivated maize in numerous varieties throughout Mesoamerica; they cooked, ground and processed it through nixtamalization. It was believed that beginning about 2500 BC, the crop spread through much of the Americas. Research of the 21st century has established even earlier dates. The region developed a trade network based on surplus and varieties of maize crops.

Mapuches of south-central Chile cultivated maize along with quinoa and potatoes in pre-Hispanic times; however, potato was the staple food of most Mapuches, "specially in the southern and coastal [Mapuche] territories where maize did not reach maturity". Before the expansion of the Inca Empire maize was traded and transported as far south as 40°19' S in Melinquina, Lácar Department. In that location maize remains were found inside pottery dated to 730 ± 80 BP and 920 ± 60 BP. Probably this maize was brought across the Andes from Chile. The presence of maize in Guaitecas Archipelago (43°55' S), the southernmost outpost of pre-Hispanic agriculture, is reported by early Spanish explorers. However the Spanish may have misidentified the plant.

By at least 1000 BCE, the Olmec in Mesoamerica had based their calendar, language, myths and worldview with maize at the center of their symbolism.

Columbian exchange 
After the arrival of Europeans in 1492, Spanish settlers consumed maize, and explorers and traders carried it back to Europe and introduced it to other countries. Spanish settlers much preferred wheat bread to maize, cassava, or potatoes. Maize flour could not be substituted for wheat for communion bread, since in Christian belief only wheat could undergo transubstantiation and be transformed into the body of Christ. Some Spaniards worried that by eating indigenous foods, which they did not consider nutritious, they would weaken and risk turning into Indians. "In the view of Europeans, it was the food they ate, even more than the environment in which they lived, that gave Amerindians and Spaniards both their distinctive physical characteristics and their characteristic personalities." Despite these worries, Spaniards did consume maize. Archeological evidence from Florida sites indicate they cultivated it as well.

Maize spread to the rest of the world because of its ability to grow in diverse climates. It was cultivated in Spain just a few decades after Columbus's voyages and then spread to Italy, West Africa and elsewhere.
Widespread cultivation most likely began in southern Spain in 1525, after which it quickly spread to the rest of the Spanish Empire including its territories in Italy (and, from there, to other Italian states). By the 17th century it was a common peasant food in Southwestern Europe, including Portugal, Spain, southern France, and Italy. By the 18th century, it was the chief food of the southern French and Italian peasantry, especially in the form of polenta in Italy.

Names 

The word maize derives from the Spanish form of the indigenous Taíno word for the plant, mahiz. Linnaeus included the common name maize as the species epithet in Zea mays. It is known by other names including "corn" in some English speaking countries.

Maize is preferred in formal, scientific, and international usage as a common name because it refers specifically to this one grain, unlike corn, which has a complex variety of meanings that vary by context and geographic region. The US and a handful of other English-speaking countries primarily use corn, though most countries use the term maize. The word maize is considered interchangeable in place of corn in the West; during early British and American trade, all grains were considered corn. Maize retained the name corn in the West as the primary grain in these trade relationships.

The word "corn" outside the US, Canada, Australia, and New Zealand is synonymous with grain referring to any cereal crop with its meaning understood to vary geographically to refer to the local staple, such as wheat in England and oats in Scotland or Ireland. In the United States, Canada, Australia, and New Zealand, corn primarily means maize. This usage started as a shortening of "Indian corn" in 18th century North America. During European colonization of North America, confusion would occur between British and North American English speakers using the term corn so that North American speakers would need to clarify that they were talking about Indian corn or maize, such as in a conversation between the Massachusetts Bay governor Thomas Hutchinson and the British king George III. "Indian corn" primarily means maize (the staple grain of indigenous Americans) but can also refer more specifically to multicolored "flint corn" used for decoration. Other common names include barajovar, makka, silk maize, and zea.

Betty Fussell writes in an article on the history of the word "corn" in North  America that "[t]o say the word "corn" is to plunge into the tragi-farcical mistranslations of language and history". Similar to the British, the Spanish referred to maize as panizo, a generic term for cereal grains, as did Italians with the term polenta. The British later referred to maize as Turkey wheat, Turkey corn, or Indian corn with Fusell commenting that "they meant not a place but a condition, a savage rather than a civilized grain", especially with Turkish people later naming it kukuruz, or barbaric.

International groups such as the Centre for Agriculture and Bioscience International also consider maize the preferred common name. The word maize is used by agricultural bodies and research institutes such as the UN's FAO, the International Maize and Wheat Improvement Center based out of Mexico, and the Indian Institute of Maize Research. National agricultural and industry associations often include the word maize in their name such as the Maize Association of Australia, and the National Maize Association of Nigeria.

In Southern Africa, maize is commonly called mielie (Afrikaans) or mealie (English), words possibly derived from the Portuguese word for maize, milho, but more probably from Dutch meel or English meal, meaning the edible part of a grain or pulse.

Structure and physiology 
The maize plant is often  in height, though some natural strains can grow , and the tallest recorded plant reached almost . The stem is commonly composed of 20 internodes of  length. The leaves arise from the nodes, alternately on opposite sides on the stalk, and have entire margins.

The apex of the stem ends in the tassel, an inflorescence of male flowers. When the tassel is mature and conditions are suitably warm and dry, anthers on the tassel dehisce and release pollen. Maize pollen is anemophilous (dispersed by wind), and because of its large settling velocity, most pollen falls within a few meters of the tassel.

They are female inflorescences, tightly enveloped by several layers of ear leaves commonly called husks.

Elongated stigmas, called silks, emerge from the whorl of husk leaves at the end of the ear. At the end of each is a carpel, which may develop into a "kernel" if fertilized by a pollen grain. The pericarp of the fruit is fused with the seed coat referred to as "caryopsis", typical of the grasses, and the entire kernel is often referred to as the "seed". The cob is close to a multiple fruit in structure, except that the individual fruits (the kernels) never fuse into a single mass. The grains are about the size of peas, and adhere in regular rows around a white, pithy substance, which forms the cob. The maximum size of kernels is reputedly . An ear commonly holds 600 kernels. They are of various colors: blackish, bluish-gray, purple, green, red, white and yellow. When ground into flour, maize yields more flour with much less bran than wheat does. It lacks the protein gluten of wheat and, therefore, makes baked goods with poor rising capability. A genetic variant that accumulates more sugar and less starch in the ear is consumed as a vegetable and is called sweet corn. Young ears can be consumed raw, with the cob and silk, but as the plant matures (usually during the summer months), the cob becomes tougher and the silk dries to inedibility. By the end of the growing season, the kernels dry out and become difficult to chew without cooking.

Planting density affects multiple aspects of maize. Modern farming techniques in developed countries usually rely on dense planting, which produces one ear per stalk. Stands of silage maize are yet denser, and achieve a lower percentage of ears and more plant matter.

Maize is a facultative short-day plant and flowers in a certain number of growing degree days >  in the environment to which it is adapted. The magnitude of the influence that long nights have on the number of days that must pass before maize flowers is genetically prescribed and regulated by the phytochrome system. Photoperiodicity can be eccentric in tropical cultivars such that the long days characteristic of higher latitudes allow the plants to grow so tall that they do not have enough time to produce seed before being killed by frost. These attributes, however, may prove useful in using tropical maize for biofuels.

Immature maize shoots accumulate a powerful antibiotic substance, 2,4-dihydroxy-7-methoxy-1,4-benzoxazin-3-one (DIMBOA). DIMBOA is a member of a group of hydroxamic acids (also known as benzoxazinoids) that serve as a natural defense against a wide range of pests, including insects, pathogenic fungi and bacteria. DIMBOA is also found in related grasses, particularly wheat. A maize mutant (bx) lacking DIMBOA is highly susceptible to attack by aphids and fungi. DIMBOA is also responsible for the relative resistance of immature maize to the European corn borer (family Crambidae). As maize matures, DIMBOA levels and resistance to the corn borer decline.

Because of its shallow roots, maize is susceptible to droughts, intolerant of nutrient-deficient soils, and prone to be uprooted by severe winds.

While yellow maizes derive their color from lutein and zeaxanthin, in red-colored maizes, the kernel coloration is due to anthocyanins and phlobaphenes. These latter substances are synthesized in the flavonoids synthetic pathway from polymerization of flavan-4-ols by the expression of maize pericarp color1 (p1) gene which encodes an R2R3 myb-like transcriptional activator of the A1 gene encoding for the dihydroflavonol 4-reductase (reducing dihydroflavonols into flavan-4-ols) while another gene (Suppressor of Pericarp Pigmentation 1 or SPP1) acts as a suppressor. The p1 gene encodes an Myb-homologous transcriptional activator of genes required for biosynthesis of red phlobaphene pigments, while the P1-wr allele specifies colorless kernel pericarp and red cobs, and unstable factor for orange1 (Ufo1) modifies P1-wr expression to confer pigmentation in kernel pericarp, as well as vegetative tissues, which normally do not accumulate significant amounts of phlobaphene pigments. The maize P gene encodes a Myb homolog that recognizes the sequence CCT/AACC, in sharp contrast with the C/TAACGG bound by vertebrate Myb proteins.

The ear leaf is the leaf most closely associated with a particular developing ear. This leaf and above contribute 70% to 75% to 90% of grain fill. Therefore fungicide application is most important in that region in most disease environments.

Abnormal flowers 
Maize flowers may sometimes exhibit mutations that lead to the formation of female flowers in the tassel. These mutations, ts4 and Ts6, prohibit the development of the stamen while simultaneously promoting pistil development. This may cause inflorescences containing both male and female flowers, or hermaphrodite flowers.

Genomics and genetics 

Maize is an annual grass in the family Gramineae, which includes such plants as wheat, rye, barley, rice, sorghum, and sugarcane. There are two major species of the genus Zea (out of six total): Z. mays (maize) and Z. diploperennis, which is a perennial type of teosinte. The annual teosinte variety called Z. m. mexicana is the closest botanical relative to maize. It still grows in the wild as an annual in Mexico and Guatemala.

Many forms of maize are used for food, sometimes classified as various subspecies related to the amount of starch each has:
 Flour corn: Z. m. var. amylacea
 Popcorn: Z. m. var. everta
 Dent corn : Z. m. var. indentata
 Flint corn: Z. m. var. indurata
 Sweet corn: Z. m. var. saccharata and Z. m. var. rugosa
 Waxy corn: Z. m. var. ceratina
 Amylomaize: Z. mays
 Pod corn: Z. m. var. tunicata Larrañaga ex A. St. Hil.
 Striped maize: Z. m. var. japonica

This system has been replaced (though not entirely displaced) over the last 60 years by multivariable classifications based on ever more data. Agronomic data were supplemented by botanical traits for a robust initial classification, then genetic, cytological, protein and DNA evidence was added. Now, the categories are forms (little used), races, racial complexes, and recently branches.

Maize is a diploid with 20 chromosomes (n=10). The combined length of the chromosomes is 1500 cM. Some of the maize chromosomes have what are known as "chromosomal knobs": highly repetitive heterochromatic domains that stain darkly. Individual knobs are polymorphic among strains of both maize and teosinte. Hufford et al., 2012 finds that 83% of allelic variation within the genome derives from its teosinte ancestors, primarily due to the freedom of Zeas to outcross.

Barbara McClintock used these knob markers to validate her transposon theory of "jumping genes", for which she won the 1983 Nobel Prize in Physiology or Medicine. Maize is still an important model organism for genetics and developmental biology today.

The centromeres have two types of structural components, both of which are found only in the centromeres: Large arrays of CentC, a short satellite DNA; and a few of a family of retrotransposons. The B chromosome, unlike the others, contains an additional repeat which extends into neighboring areas of the chromosome. Centromeres can accidentally shrink during division and still function, although it is thought this will fail if it shrinks below a few hundred kilobase. Kinetochores contain RNA originating from centromeres. Centromere regions can become inactive, and can continue in that state if the chromosome still has another active one.

The Maize Genetics Cooperation Stock Center, funded by the USDA Agricultural Research Service and located in the Department of Crop Sciences at the University of Illinois at Urbana-Champaign, is a stock center of maize mutants. The total collection has nearly 80,000 samples. The bulk of the collection consists of several hundred named genes, plus additional gene combinations and other heritable variants. There are about 1000 chromosomal aberrations (e.g., translocations and inversions) and stocks with abnormal chromosome numbers (e.g., tetraploids). Genetic data describing the maize mutant stocks as well as myriad other data about maize genetics can be accessed at MaizeGDB, the Maize Genetics and Genomics Database.

In 2005, the US National Science Foundation (NSF), Department of Agriculture (USDA) and the Department of Energy (DOE) formed a consortium to sequence the B73 maize genome. The resulting DNA sequence data was deposited immediately into GenBank, a public repository for genome-sequence data. Sequences and genome annotations have also been made available throughout the project's lifetime at the project's official site.

Primary sequencing of the maize genome was completed in 2008. On November 20, 2009, the consortium published results of its sequencing effort in Science. The genome, 85% of which is composed of transposons, was found to contain 32,540 genes (By comparison, the human genome contains about 2.9 billion bases and 26,000 genes). Much of the maize genome has been duplicated and reshuffled by helitrons—group of rolling circle transposons.

In Z. mays and various other angiosperms the MADS-box motif is involved in floral development. Early study in several angiosperm models including Z. mays was the beginning of research into the molecular evolution of floral structure in general, as well as their role in nonflowering plants.

Varieties differ in their resistance to insects, including borers. CIMMYT maintains a large collection of maize/corn accessions tested and cataloged for insect resistance.

Evolution
As with many plants and animals, Z. mays has a positive correlation between effective population size and the magnitude of selection pressure. Z. m. having an EPS of ~650,000, it clusters with others of about the same EPS, and has 79% of its amino acid sites under selection.

Recombination is a significant source of diversity in Z. mays. (Note that this finding supersedes previous studies which showed no such correlation.)

This recombination/diversity effect is seen throughout plants but is also found to not occur – or not as strongly – in regions of high gene density. This is likely the reason that domesticated Z. mays has not seen as much of an increase in diversity within areas of higher density as in regions of lower density, although there is more evidence in other plants.

Some lines of maize have undergone ancient polyploidy events, starting 11 million years ago. Over that time ~72% of polyploid duplicated genes have been retained, which is higher than other plants with older polyploidy events. Thus maize may be due to lose more duplicate genes as time goes along, similar to the course followed by the genomes of other plants. If so - if gene loss has merely not occurred yet - that could explain the lack of observed positive selection and lower negative selection which are observed in otherwise similar plants, i.e. also naturally outcrossing and with similar effective population sizes.

Ploidy does not appear to influence EPS or magnitude of selection effect in maize.

Breeding 
Maize reproduces sexually each year. This randomly selects half the genes from a given plant to propagate to the next generation, meaning that desirable traits found in the crop (like high yield or good nutrition) can be lost in subsequent generations unless certain techniques are used.

Maize breeding in prehistory resulted in large plants producing large ears. Modern breeding began with individuals who selected highly productive varieties in their fields and then sold seed to other farmers. James L. Reid was one of the earliest and most successful developing Reid's Yellow Dent in the 1860s. These early efforts were based on mass selection. Later breeding efforts included ear to row selection (C. G. Hopkins c. 1896), hybrids made from selected inbred lines (G. H. Shull, 1909), and the highly successful double cross hybrids using four inbred lines (D. F. Jones c. 1918, 1922). University supported breeding programs were especially important in developing and introducing modern hybrids. By the 1930s, companies such as Pioneer devoted to production of hybrid maize had begun to influence long-term development. Internationally important seed banks such as the International Maize and Wheat Improvement Center (CIMMYT) and the US bank at the Maize Genetics Cooperation Stock Center University of Illinois at Urbana-Champaign maintain germplasm important for future crop development.

Since the 1940s the best strains of maize have been first-generation hybrids made from inbred strains that have been optimized for specific traits, such as yield, nutrition, drought, pest and disease tolerance. Both conventional cross-breeding and genetic engineering have succeeded in increasing output and reducing the need for cropland, pesticides, water and fertilizer. There is conflicting evidence to support the hypothesis that maize yield potential has increased over the past few decades. This suggests that changes in yield potential are associated with leaf angle, lodging resistance, tolerance of high plant density, disease/pest tolerance, and other agronomic traits rather than increase of yield potential per individual plant.

Certain varieties of maize have been bred to produce many ears which are the source of the "baby corn" used as a vegetable in Asian cuisine.

CIMMYT operates a conventional breeding program to provide optimized strains. The program began in the 1980s. Hybrid seeds are distributed in Africa by the Drought Tolerant Maize for Africa project.

Genetic engineering 

Genetically engineered (GE) maize was one of the 26 GE crops grown commercially in 2016. The vast majority of this is Bt maize. Grown since 1997 in the United States and Canada, 92% of the US maize crop was genetically modified in 2016 and 33% of the worldwide maize crop was GM in 2016. As of 2011, Herbicide-tolerant maize varieties were grown in Argentina, Australia, Brazil, Canada, China, Colombia, El Salvador, the European Union, Honduras, Japan, Korea, Malaysia, Mexico, New Zealand, Philippines, the Russian Federation, Singapore, South Africa, Taiwan, Thailand, and the United States. Insect-resistant maize was grown in Argentina, Australia, Brazil, Canada, Chile, China, Colombia, Egypt, the European Union, Honduras, Japan, Korea, Malaysia, Mexico, New Zealand, Philippines, South Africa, Switzerland, Taiwan, the United States, and Uruguay.

In September 2000, up to $50 million worth of food products were recalled due to the presence of Starlink genetically modified corn, which had been approved only for animal consumption and had not been approved for human consumption, and was subsequently withdrawn from the market.

For pest and disease resistance 
Tropical landraces remain an important and underused source of resistance alleles for disease and for herbivores. Notable discoveries of rare alleles for this purpose were made by Dao et al., 2014 and Sood et al., 2014. Rashid et al., 2018 use an association mapping panel from CIMMYT originally developed for tropical drought tolerance traits to find new genomic regions providing sorghum downy mildew resistance, and to further characterize SDMR regions already located by others.

Origin 

Maize is the domesticated variant of teosinte. The two plants have dissimilar appearance, maize having a single tall stalk with multiple leaves and teosinte being a short, bushy plant. The difference between the two is largely controlled by differences in just two genes, called grassy tillers-1 (gt1) and teosinte branched-1 (tb1).

Several theories had been proposed about the specific origin of maize in Mesoamerica:
 It is a direct domestication of a Mexican annual teosinte, Z. m. ssp. parviglumis, native to the Balsas River valley in south-eastern Mexico, with up to 12% of its genetic material obtained from Z. m. ssp. mexicana through introgression.
 It has been derived from hybridization between a small domesticated maize (a slightly changed form of a wild maize) and a teosinte of section Luxuriantes, either Z. luxurians or Z. diploperennis.
 It has undergone two or more domestications either of a wild maize or of a teosinte. (The term "teosinte" describes all species and subspecies in the genus Zea, excluding Z. m. ssp. mays.)
 It has evolved from a hybridization of Z. diploperennis by Tripsacum dactyloides.
In the late 1930s, Paul Mangelsdorf suggested that domesticated maize was the result of a hybridization event between an unknown wild maize and a species of Tripsacum, a related genus. This theory about the origin of maize has been refuted by modern genetic testing, which refutes Mangelsdorf's model and the fourth listed above.

The teosinte origin theory was proposed by the Russian botanist Nikolai Ivanovich Vavilov in 1931 and the later American Nobel Prize-winner George Beadle in 1932. It is supported experimentally and by recent studies of the plants' genomes. Teosinte and maize can cross-breed and produce fertile offspring. A number of questions remain concerning the species, among them:
 how the immense diversity of the species of sect. Zea originated,
 how the tiny archaeological specimens of 3500–2700 BC could have been selected from a teosinte, and
 how domestication could have proceeded without leaving remains of teosinte or maize with teosintoid traits earlier than the earliest known until recently, dating from ca. 1100 BC.

The domestication of maize is of particular interest to researchers—archaeologists, geneticists, ethnobotanists, geographers, etc. The process is thought by some to have started 7,500 to 12,000 years ago. Research from the 1950s to 1970s originally focused on the hypothesis that maize domestication occurred in the highlands between the states of Oaxaca and Jalisco, because the oldest archaeological remains of maize known at the time were found there.

Connection with 'parviglumis' subspecies 

Genetic studies, published in 2004 by John Doebley, identified Zea mays ssp. parviglumis, native to the Balsas River valley in Mexico's southwestern highlands, and also known as Balsas teosinte, as being the crop wild relative that is genetically most similar to modern maize. This was confirmed by further studies, which refined this hypothesis somewhat. Archaeobotanical studies, published in 2009, point to the middle part of the Balsas River valley as the likely location of early domestication; this river is not very long, so these locations are not very distant. Stone milling tools with maize residue have been found in an 8,700 year old layer of deposits in a cave not far from Iguala, Guerrero.

Doebley was part of the team that first published, in 2002, that maize had been domesticated only once, about 9,000 years ago, and then spread throughout the Americas.

A primitive corn was being grown in southern Mexico, Central America, and northern South America 7,000 years ago. Archaeological remains of early maize ears, found at Guila Naquitz Cave in the Oaxaca Valley, date back roughly 6,250 years; the oldest ears from caves near Tehuacan, Puebla, 5,450 B.P.

Maize pollen dated to 7,300 B.P. from San Andres, Tabasco, on the Caribbean coast has also been recovered.

As maize was introduced to new cultures, new uses were developed and new varieties selected to better serve in those preparations. Maize was the staple food, or a major staple – along with squash, Andean region potato, quinoa, beans, and amaranth – of most pre-Columbian North American, Mesoamerican, South American, and Caribbean cultures. The Mesoamerican civilization, in particular, was deeply interrelated with maize. Its traditions and rituals involved all aspects of maize cultivation – from the planting to the food preparation. Maize formed the Mesoamerican people's identity.

It is unknown what precipitated its domestication, because the edible portion of the wild variety is too small, and hard to obtain, to be eaten directly, as each kernel is enclosed in a very hard bivalve shell.

In 1939, George Beadle demonstrated that the kernels of teosinte are readily "popped" for human consumption, like modern popcorn. Some have argued it would have taken too many generations of selective breeding to produce large, compressed ears for efficient cultivation. However, studies of the hybrids readily made by intercrossing teosinte and modern maize suggest this objection is not well founded.

Spreading to the north 
Around 4,500 years ago, maize began to spread to the north. Maize was first cultivated in what is now the United States at several sites in New Mexico and Arizona about 4,100 years ago.

During the first millennium AD, maize cultivation spread more widely in the areas north. In particular, the large-scale adoption of maize agriculture and consumption in eastern North America took place about A.D. 900. Native Americans cleared large forest and grassland areas for the new crop.

In 2005, research by the USDA Forest Service suggested that the rise in maize cultivation 500 to 1,000 years ago in what is now the southeastern United States corresponded with a decline of freshwater mussels, which are very sensitive to environmental changes.

Cultivation

Planting 

Because it is cold-intolerant, in the temperate zones maize must be planted in the spring. Its root system is generally shallow, so the plant is dependent on soil moisture. As a plant that uses C4 carbon fixation, maize is a considerably more water-efficient crop than plants that use C3 carbon fixation such as alfalfa and soybeans. Maize is most sensitive to drought at the time of silk emergence, when the flowers are ready for pollination. In the United States, a good harvest was traditionally predicted if the maize was "knee-high by the Fourth of July", although modern hybrids generally exceed this growth rate. Maize used for silage is harvested while the plant is green and the fruit immature. Sweet corn is harvested in the "milk stage", after pollination but before starch has formed, between late summer and early to mid-autumn. Field maize is left in the field until very late in the autumn to thoroughly dry the grain, and may, in fact, sometimes not be harvested until winter or even early spring. The importance of sufficient soil moisture is shown in many parts of Africa, where periodic drought regularly causes maize crop failure and consequent famine. Although it is grown mainly in wet, hot climates, it has been said to thrive in cold, hot, dry or wet conditions, meaning that it is an extremely versatile crop.

Maize was planted by the Native Americans in hills, in a complex system known to some as the Three Sisters. Maize provided support for beans, and the beans provided nitrogen derived from nitrogen-fixing rhizobia bacteria which live on the roots of beans and other legumes; and squashes provided ground cover to stop weeds and inhibit evaporation by providing shade over the soil. Modern technique plants maize in rows which allows for cultivation while the plant is young, although the hill technique is still used in the maize fields of some Native American reservations. When maize is planted in rows, it also allows for planting of other crops between these rows to make more efficient use of land space.

In most regions today, maize grown in residential gardens is still often planted manually with a hoe, whereas maize grown commercially is no longer planted manually but rather is planted with a planter. In North America, fields are often planted in a two-crop rotation with a nitrogen-fixing crop, often alfalfa in cooler climates and soybeans in regions with longer summers. Sometimes a third crop, winter wheat, is added to the rotation.

Many of the maize varieties grown in the United States and Canada are hybrids. Often the varieties have been genetically modified to tolerate glyphosate or to provide protection against natural pests. Glyphosate is an herbicide which kills all plants except those with genetic tolerance. This genetic tolerance is very rarely found in nature.

In the midwestern United States, low-till or no-till farming techniques are usually used. In low-till, fields are covered once, maybe twice, with a tillage implement either ahead of crop planting or after the previous harvest. The fields are planted and fertilized. Weeds are controlled through the use of herbicides, and no cultivation tillage is done during the growing season. This technique reduces moisture evaporation from the soil, and thus provides more moisture for the crop.
The technologies mentioned in the previous paragraph enable low-till and no-till farming. Weeds compete with the crop for moisture and nutrients, making them undesirable.

Harvesting 

Maize harvested as a grain crop can be kept in the field a relatively long time, even months, after the crop is ready to harvest; it is also harvested and stored in the husk leaves if kept dry. 
Before the 20th century, all maize harvesting was by manual labour, by grazing, or by some combination of those. Whether the ears were hand-picked and the stover was grazed, or the whole plant was cut, gathered, and shocked, people and livestock did all the work. Between the 1890s and the 1970s, the technology of maize harvesting expanded greatly. Today, all such technologies, from entirely manual harvesting to entirely mechanized, are still in use to some degree, as appropriate to each farm's needs, although the thoroughly mechanized versions predominate, as they offer the lowest unit costs when scaled to large farm operations.

Before World War II, most maize in North America was harvested by hand. This involved a large number of workers and associated social events (husking or shucking bees). From the 1890s onward, some machinery became available to partially mechanize the processes, such as one- and two-row mechanical pickers (picking the ear, leaving the stover) and corn binders, which are reaper-binders designed specifically for maize (for example). The latter produce sheaves that can be shocked. By hand or mechanical picker, the entire ear is harvested, which then requires a separate operation of a maize sheller to remove the kernels from the ear. Whole ears of maize were often stored in corn cribs, and these whole ears are a sufficient form for some livestock feeding use. Today corn cribs with whole ears, and corn binders, are less common because most modern farms harvest the grain from the field with a combine and store it in bins. The combine with a corn head (with points and snap rolls instead of a reel) does not cut the stalk; it simply pulls the stalk down. The stalk continues downward and is crumpled into a mangled pile on the ground, where it usually is left to become organic matter for the soil. The ear of maize is too large to pass between slots in a plate as the snap rolls pull the stalk away, leaving only the ear and husk to enter the machinery. The combine separates the husk and the cob, keeping only the kernels.

The entire maize plant is also harvested as a silage crop.

For storing grain in bins, the moisture of the grain must be sufficiently low to avoid spoiling. If the moisture content of the harvested grain is too high, grain dryers are used to reduce the moisture content by blowing heated air through the grain. This can require large amounts of energy in the form of combustible gases (propane or natural gas) and electricity to power the blowers.

Production 

Maize is widely cultivated throughout the world, and a greater weight of maize is produced each year than any other grain. In 2020, total world production was 1.16 billion tonnes, led by the United States with 31.0% of the total (table). China produced 22.4% of the global total.

United States 

In 2016, maize production was forecast to be over 380 million metric tons (15 billion bushels), an increase of 11% over 2014 American production. Based on conditions as of August 2016, the expected yield would be the highest ever for the United States. The area of harvested maize was forecast to be , an increase of 7% over 2015. Maize is especially popular in Midwestern states such as Indiana, Iowa, and Illinois; in the latter, it was named the state's official grain in 2017.

The estimated corn usage for crop year September 1, 2020 to August 31, 2021, was 38.7 percent was used for feed, 34 percent for ethanol, 17.5 percent for export, and 9.8 percent for food.

Trade 
Corn futures are traded on several exchanges, the Chicago Board of Trade (CBOT) and JSE Derivatives (JDERIV). The Chicago Board Of Trade sells corn futures with a contact size of 5000 bushels which is quoted in cents/bushel and the JDERIV has a contact size of 100 Tonnes, quoted in Rand/Ton. The detailed contract specifications are listed below:

Pests

Insects 
 African armyworm (Spodoptera exempta)
 African sugarcane borer (Eldana saccharina)
 Asian corn borer (Ostrinia furnacalis)
 Common armyworm (Pseudaletia unipuncta)
 Common earwig (Forficula auricularia)
 Corn delphacid (Peregrinus maidis)
 Corn leaf aphid (Rhopalosiphum maidis)
 Corn rootworms (Diabrotica spp) including Western corn rootworm (Diabrotica virgifera virgifera LeConte), Northern corn rootworm (D. barberi or D. longicornis) and Southern corn rootworm (D. undecimpunctata howardi)
 Corn silkfly (Euxesta stigmatias)
 Dusky sap beetle (Carpophilus lugubris)
 European corn borer (Ostrinia nubilalis) (ECB)
 Fall armyworm (Spodoptera frugiperda) Some sweet corn varieties have developed partial resistance to fall army worms by producing a unique 33-kD proteinase that significantly retards fall army worm growth.
 Corn earworm/Cotton bollworm (Helicoverpa zea)
 Lesser cornstalk borer (Elasmopalpus lignosellus)
 Maize weevil (Sitophilus zeamais)
 Northern armyworm, Oriental armyworm or Rice ear-cutting caterpillar (Mythimna separata)
 Southwestern corn borer (Diatraea grandiosella)
 Stalk borer (Papaipema nebris)

The susceptibility of maize to the European corn borer and corn rootworms, and the resulting large crop losses which are estimated at a billion dollars worldwide for each pest, led to the development of transgenics expressing the Bacillus thuringiensis toxin. "Bt maize" is widely grown in the United States and has been approved for release in Europe.

Diseases 

 Rust
 Corn smut or common smut (Ustilago maydis): a fungal disease, known in Mexico as huitlacoche, which is prized by some as a gourmet delicacy in itself
 Northern corn leaf blight (Purdue Extension site) (Pioneer site) 
 Southern corn leaf blight
 Maize downy mildew (Peronosclerospora spp.)
 Maize dwarf mosaic virus
 Maize streak virus
 Stewart's wilt (Pantoea stewartii)
 Goss's wilt (Clavibacter michiganensis subsp. nebraskensis)
 Grey leaf spot
 Mal de Río Cuarto virus (MRCV)
 Stalk rot
 Ear rot
 Aspergillus flavus
 A. parasiticus

Storage 
Drying is vital to prevent or at least reduce mycotoxin contamination. Aspergillus and Fusarium spp. are the most common mycotoxin sources, but there are others. Altogether maize contaminants are so common, and this crop is so economically important, that maize mycotoxins are among the most important in agriculture in general.

Uses

Human food 

Maize and cornmeal (ground dried maize) constitute a staple food in many regions of the world. Maize is used to produce cornstarch, a common ingredient in home cooking and many industrialized food products. Maize starch can be hydrolyzed and enzymatically treated to produce syrups, particularly high fructose corn syrup, a sweetener; and also fermented and distilled to produce grain alcohol. Grain alcohol from maize is traditionally the source of Bourbon whiskey. Corn flour is used to make cornbread and other baked products.

In prehistoric times Mesoamerican women used a metate to process maize into ground cornmeal, allowing the preparation of foods that were more calorie dense than popcorn. After ceramic vessels were invented the Olmec people began to cook maize together with beans, improving the nutritional value of the staple meal. Although maize naturally contains niacin, an important nutrient, it was not bioavailable without the process of nixtamalization. The Maya used nixtamal meal to make varieties of porridges and tamales. The process was later used in the cuisine of the American South to prepare corn for grits and hominy.

Maize is a staple of Mexican cuisine. Masa (cornmeal treated with limewater) is the main ingredient for tortillas, atole and many other dishes of Central American food. It is the main ingredient of corn tortilla, tamales, pozole, atole and all the dishes based on them, like tacos, quesadillas, chilaquiles, enchiladas, tostadas and many more. In Mexico the fungus of maize, known as huitlacoche, is considered a delicacy.

Coarse maize meal is made into a thick porridge in many cultures: from the polenta of Italy, the angu of Brazil, the mămăligă of Romania, to cornmeal mush in the US (or hominy grits in the South) or the food called mieliepap in South Africa and sadza, nshima, ugali and other names in other parts of Africa. Introduced into Africa by the Portuguese in the 16th century, maize has become Africa's most important staple food crop. These are commonly eaten in the Southeastern United States, foods handed down from Native Americans, who called the dish sagamite.

Maize can also be harvested and consumed in the unripe state, when the kernels are fully grown but still soft. Unripe maize must usually be cooked to become palatable; this may be done by simply boiling or roasting the whole ears and eating the kernels right off the cob. Sweet corn, a genetic variety that is high in sugars and low in starch, is usually consumed in the unripe state. Such corn on the cob is a common dish in the United States, Canada, United Kingdom, Cyprus, some parts of South America, and the Balkans, but virtually unheard of in some European countries. Corn on the cob was hawked on the streets of early 19th-century New York City by poor, barefoot "Hot Corn Girls", who were thus the precursors of hot dog carts, churro wagons, and fruit stands seen on the streets of big cities today.

Within the United States, the usage of maize for human consumption constitutes only around 1/40th of the amount grown in the country. In the United States and Canada, maize is mostly grown to feed livestock, as forage, silage (made by fermentation of chopped green cornstalks), or grain. Maize meal is also a significant ingredient of some commercial animal food products.

Nutritional value 

Raw, yellow, sweet maize kernels are composed of 76% water, 19% carbohydrates, 3% protein, and 1% fat (table). In a 100-gram serving, maize kernels provide 86 calories and are a good source (10–19% of the Daily Value) of the B vitamins, thiamin, niacin (but see Pellagra warning below), pantothenic acid (B5) and folate (right table for raw, uncooked kernels, USDA Nutrient Database). In moderate amounts, they also supply dietary fiber and the essential minerals, magnesium and phosphorus whereas other nutrients are in low amounts (table).

Maize has suboptimal amounts of the essential amino acids tryptophan and lysine, which accounts for its lower status as a protein source. However, the proteins of beans and legumes complement those of maize.

Feed and fodder for livestock 

Maize is a major source of both grain feed and fodder for livestock. It is fed to the livestock in various ways. When it is used as a grain crop, the dried kernels are used as feed. They are often kept on the cob for storage in a corn crib, or they may be shelled off for storage in a grain bin. The farm that consumes the feed may produce it, purchase it on the market, or some of both. When the grain is used for feed, the rest of the plant (the corn stover) can be used later as fodder, bedding (litter), or soil amendment. When the whole maize plant (grain plus stalks and leaves) is used for fodder, it is usually chopped all at once and ensilaged, as digestibility and palatability are higher in the ensilaged form than in the dried form. Maize silage is one of the most valuable forages for ruminants. Before the advent of widespread ensilaging, it was traditional to gather the corn into shocks after harvesting, where it dried further. With or without a subsequent move to the cover of a barn, it was then stored for weeks to several months until fed to the livestock. Today ensilaging can occur not only in siloes but also in silage wrappers. However, in the tropics, maize can be harvested year-round and fed as green forage to the animals.

Chemicals 
Starch from maize can also be made into plastics, fabrics, adhesives, and many other chemical products.

The corn steep liquor, a plentiful watery byproduct of maize wet milling process, is widely used in the biochemical industry and research as a culture medium to grow many kinds of microorganisms.

Chrysanthemin is found in purple corn and is used as a food coloring.

Bio-fuel 

"Feed maize" is being used increasingly for heating; specialized corn stoves (similar to wood stoves) are available and use either feed maize or wood pellets to generate heat. Maize cobs are also used as a biomass fuel source. Maize is relatively cheap and home-heating furnaces have been developed which use maize kernels as a fuel. They feature a large hopper that feeds the uniformly sized maize kernels (or wood pellets or cherry pits) into the fire.

Maize is increasingly used as a feedstock for the production of ethanol fuel. When considering where to construct an ethanol plant, one of the site selection criteria is to ensure there is locally available feedstock. Ethanol is mixed with gasoline to decrease the amount of pollutants emitted when used to fuel motor vehicles. High fuel prices in mid-2007 led to higher demand for ethanol, which in turn led to higher prices paid to farmers for maize. This led to the 2007 harvest being one of the most profitable maize crops in modern history for farmers. Because of the relationship between fuel and maize, prices paid for the crop now tend to track the price of oil. 

The price of food is affected to a certain degree by the use of maize for biofuel production. The cost of transportation, production, and marketing are a large portion (80%) of the price of food in the United States. Higher energy costs affect these costs, especially transportation. The increase in food prices the consumer has been seeing is mainly due to the higher energy cost. The effect of biofuel production on other food crop prices is indirect. Use of maize for biofuel production increases the demand, and therefore price of maize. This, in turn, results in farm acreage being diverted from other food crops to maize production. This reduces the supply of the other food crops and increases their prices.

Maize is widely used in Germany as a feedstock for biogas plants. Here the maize is harvested, shredded then placed in silage clamps from which it is fed into the biogas plants. This process makes use of the whole plant rather than simply using the kernels as in the production of fuel ethanol.

A biomass gasification power plant in Strem near Güssing, Burgenland, Austria, began in 2005. There is potential that diesel can be created from the biogas by the Fischer Tropsch method.

Increasingly, ethanol is being used at low concentrations (10% or less) as an additive in gasoline (gasohol) for motor fuels to increase the octane rating, lower pollutants, and reduce petroleum use (what is nowadays also known as "biofuels" and has been generating an intense debate regarding the human beings' necessity of new sources of energy, on the one hand, and the need to maintain, in regions such as Latin America, the food habits and culture which has been the essence of civilizations such as the one originated in Mesoamerica; the entry, January 2008, of maize among the commercial agreements of NAFTA has increased this debate, considering the bad labor conditions of workers in the fields, and mainly the fact that NAFTA "opened the doors to the import of maize from the United States, where the farmers who grow it receive multimillion-dollar subsidies and other government supports. ... According to OXFAM UK, after NAFTA went into effect, the price of maize in Mexico fell 70% between 1994 and 2001. The number of farm jobs dropped as well: from 8.1 million in 1993 to 6.8 million in 2002. Many of those who found themselves without work were small-scale maize growers."). However, introduction in the northern latitudes of the US of tropical maize for biofuels, and not for human or animal consumption, may potentially alleviate this.

Commodity 
Maize is bought and sold by investors and price speculators as a tradable commodity using corn futures contracts. These "futures" are traded on the Chicago Board of Trade (CBOT) under ticker symbol C. They are delivered every year in March, May, July, September, and December.

Ornamental and other uses 

Some forms of the plant are occasionally grown for ornamental use in the garden. For this purpose, variegated and colored leaf forms as well as those with colorful ears are used.

Corncobs can be hollowed out and treated to make inexpensive smoking pipes, first manufactured in the United States in 1869.

An unusual use for maize is to create a "corn maze" (or "maize maze") as a tourist attraction. The idea of a maize maze was introduced by the American Maze Company who created a maze in Pennsylvania in 1993. Traditional mazes are most commonly grown using yew hedges, but these take several years to mature. The rapid growth of a field of maize allows a maze to be laid out using GPS at the start of a growing season and for the maize to grow tall enough to obstruct a visitor's line of sight by the start of the summer. In Canada and the US, these are popular in many farming communities.

Maize kernels can be used in place of sand in a sandboxlike enclosure for children's play.

Stigmas from female maize flowers, popularly called corn silk, are sold as herbal supplements.

Maize is used as a fish bait, called "dough balls". It is particularly popular in Europe for coarse fishing.

Additionally, feed corn is sometimes used by hunters to bait animals such as deer or wild hogs.

United States usage breakdown 

The breakdown of usage of the 12.1-billion-bushel (307-million-tonne) 2008 US maize crop was as follows, according to the World Agricultural Supply and Demand Estimates Report by the USDA.

In the US since 2009/2010, maize feedstock use for ethanol production has somewhat exceeded direct use for livestock feed; maize use for fuel ethanol was 5,130 million bushels (130 million tonnes) in the 2013/2014 marketing year.

A fraction of the maize feedstock dry matter used for ethanol production is usefully recovered as DDGS (dried distillers grains with solubles). In the 2010/2011 marketing year, about 29.1 million tonnes of DDGS were fed to US livestock and poultry. Because starch utilization in fermentation for ethanol production leaves other grain constituents more concentrated in the residue, the feed value per kg of DDGS, with regard to ruminant-metabolizable energy and protein, exceeds that of the grain. Feed value for monogastric animals, such as swine and poultry, is somewhat lower than for ruminants.

Comparison to other staple foods 

The following table shows the nutrient content of maize and major staple foods in a raw harvested form on a dry weight basis to account for their different water contents. Raw forms are not edible and cannot be digested. These must be sprouted, or prepared and cooked for human consumption. In sprouted or cooked form, the relative nutritional and anti-nutritional contents of each of these staples are different from that of raw form of these staples reported in the table below.

Hazards

Pellagra 

When maize was first introduced into farming systems other than those used by traditional native-American peoples, it was generally welcomed with enthusiasm for its productivity. However, a widespread problem of malnutrition soon arose wherever maize was introduced as a staple food. This was a mystery, since these types of malnutrition were not normally seen among the indigenous Americans, for whom maize was the principal staple food.

It was eventually discovered that the indigenous Americans had learned to soak maize in alkali — water (the process now known as nixtamalization) — made with ashes and lime (calcium oxide) since at least 1200–1500 BC by Mesoamericans. They did this to liberate the corn hulls, but (unbeknownst to natives or colonists) it coincidentally liberates the B-vitamin niacin, the lack of which was the underlying cause of the condition known as pellagra.

Maize was introduced into the diet of non-indigenous Americans without the necessary cultural knowledge acquired over thousands of years in the Americas. In the late 19th century, pellagra reached epidemic proportions in parts of the southern US, as medical researchers debated two theories for its origin: the deficiency theory (which was eventually shown to be true) said that pellagra was due to a deficiency of some nutrient, and the germ theory said that pellagra was caused by a germ transmitted by stable flies. A third theory, promoted by the eugenicist Charles Davenport, held that people only contracted pellagra if they were susceptible to it due to certain "constitutional, inheritable" traits of the affected individual.

Once alkali processing and dietary variety were understood and applied, pellagra disappeared in the developed world. The development of high lysine maize and the promotion of a more balanced diet have also contributed to its demise. Pellagra still exists today in food-poor areas and refugee camps where people survive on donated maize.

Allergy 

Maize contains lipid transfer protein, an indigestible protein that survives cooking. This protein has been linked to a rare and understudied allergy to maize in humans. The allergic reaction can cause skin rash, swelling or itching of mucous membranes, diarrhea, vomiting, asthma and, in severe cases, anaphylaxis. It is unclear how common this allergy is in the general population.

The Z. mays plant has an OPALS allergy scale rating of 5 out of 10, indicating moderate potential to cause allergic reactions, exacerbated by over-use of the same plant throughout a garden. Corn pollen is heavy, large, and usually airborne in the early morning.

Mycotoxins 
Fungicide application does not reduce fungal growth or mycotoxin dramatically, although it can be a part of a successful reduction strategy. Among the most common toxins are those produced by Aspergillus and Fusarium spp. The most common toxins are aflatoxins, fumonisins, zearalenone, and ochratoxin A. Bt maize discourages insect vectors and by so doing it dramatically reduces concentrations of fumonisins, significantly reduces aflatoxins, but only mildly reduces others.

Art 

Maize has been an essential crop in the Andes since the pre-Columbian era. The Moche culture from Northern Peru made ceramics from earth, water, and fire. This pottery was a sacred substance, formed in significant shapes and used to represent important themes. Maize was represented anthropomorphically as well as naturally.

In the United States, maize ears along with tobacco leaves are carved into the capitals of columns in the United States Capitol building. Maize itself is sometimes used for temporary architectural detailing when the intent is to celebrate the fall season, local agricultural productivity and culture. Bundles of dried maize stalks are often displayed along with pumpkins, gourds and straw in autumnal displays outside homes and businesses. A well-known example of architectural use is the Corn Palace in Mitchell, South Dakota, which uses cobs and ears of colored maize to implement a mural design that is recycled annually. Another well-known example is the Field of Corn sculpture in Dublin, Ohio, where hundreds of concrete ears of corn stand in a grassy field.

A maize stalk with two ripe ears is depicted on the reverse of the Croatian 1 lipa coin, minted since 1993.

See also 

 Blue corn
 Purple corn
 Columbian Exchange
 Corn syrup
 Crop circle
 Detasseling
 List of maize dishes
 List of sweetcorn varieties
 Post-harvest losses (grains)
 Push–pull technology, pest control strategy for maize and sorghum
 Zein

References

Further reading 
 
 Byerlee, Derek. "The globalization of hybrid maize, 1921–70." Journal of Global History 15.1 (2020): 101–122.
 Clampitt, Cynthia. Maize: How Corn Shaped the U.S. Heartland (2015)

External links 

 Maize Genetics and Genomics Database
 Maize Genetics Cooperation Stock Center
 
 
Corn: "The Outer Limits", ca. 1976, Archives of Ontario YouTube Channel

 
Zea (plant)
Agriculture in Mesoamerica
Crops originating from Mexico
Demulcents
Energy crops
Flora of Guatemala
Flora of Mexico
Fruit vegetables
Grasses of Mexico
Plant models
Pre-Columbian Native American cuisine
Post-Columbian Native American cuisine
Pre-Columbian Southwest cuisine
Staple foods
Tropical agriculture
Plants described in 1753
Symbols of Illinois